Rabbi Yishai Fleisher (born 1976) is a pro-Israel activist, a podcast host, and international spokesperson for the Jewish community of Hebron in Israel. Fleisher is a strong advocate of aliyah, the migration to Israel of Jews from around the world having founded the Kumah organization.

Early life
Yishai Fleisher was born in 1976 in Haifa, Israel to Jewish refuseniks from the Soviet Union. The family emigrated to the US when he was eight. Fleisher returned to Israel and served as a paratrooper in the Israel Defense Forces and was injured in Lebanon during his military service in 1997. Fleisher returned to the US where he completed an undergraduate degree in political science at Yeshiva University, then a Juris Doctorate at the Cardozo School of Law. He received his rabbinic ordination from Kollel Agudath Achim.

Career

Advocacy for Aliyah
In 1999, Fleisher co-founded Kumah, "Arise" in Hebrew, a Neo-Zionist NGO whose mission is to enhance awareness about aliyah, the immigration of Jews from around the world back to the Land of Israel, historically, which today includes the modern State of Israel.

In 2006 Fleisher co-created Free Your Mind: The Aliyah Revolution, an animated short film promoting aliyah to American Jews, using a parody of The Matrix film.

Fleisher conceptualized the idea that created Aliyah Day in 2016, which acknowledges Aliyah, immigration to the Jewish state, as a core value of the State of Israel and honors the ongoing contributions of Olim, Jewish immigrants, to Israeli society.

Advocacy for Jewish settlement in Hebron 
In 2015, Fleisher became the international spokesperson for the Jewish community of Hebron. In that capacity, Fleisher has been frequently published and interviewed. He has also met with representatives of Arab community of Hebron in order to foster Arab-Jewish relations. In 2016, Fleisher argued against UNESCO's attempt to recognize the Tomb of the Patriarchs in Hebron as a Palestinian World Heritage Site.

Broadcasting and lecturing

Fleisher speaks three languages and gives lectures. Abigail Klein Leichman of The Jewish Standard wrote in 2015, "Rabbi Fleisher has become a go-to Israel expert for international media, including CNN, BBC, Al Jazeera, Russia Today, Xinhua, MTV, Sipa Press, and Fox News. He does a podcast radio show, ...has appeared on American talk radio, and writes regularly for The Jerusalem Post and The Jewish Press."

Fleisher hosts the Yishai Fleisher Show, a weekly podcast on The Land of Israel Network. Previously, he was the director of programming at the Religious Zionist radio station, Israel National Radio (Arutz Sheva), and later director of programming at the Voice of Israel, an independent internet broadcast network located in Jerusalem.

In 2017, Fleisher penned an op-ed which was published in The New York Times entitled "A Settlers View of Israel's Future" which listed five alternatives to the Two-State Solution. In 2018, the Huffington Post revealed an internal debate among NYT staff as to whether to publish the article. New York Times editorial page editor James Bennet advocated publishing Fleisher's piece even though he disagreed with its message.

About the essay, Bennet said: "[Fleisher wrote that] the two-state solution is dead and [it's] time to face reality, and here's some alternative paths for what the future would look like. And we had a real debate about whether this piece was crossing a line, because was it denying personhood to the Palestinians? Was it an act of, kind of, hate speech in a sense? I felt strongly that we should publish the piece and we did, as did others. Because this particular viewpoint is hugely consequential. It actually is creating reality on the ground."

References

External links

 YishaiFleisher.com
 Yishai Fleisher Show (podcast)
 Fleisher's articles at Jewish Press
 Kumah organization website
 Video Free Your Mind: The Aliyah Revolution

Israeli activists
Israeli Orthodox Jews
Israeli settlers
American Orthodox Jews
Living people
Israeli radio presenters
Israeli broadcasters
Israeli mass media people
Jews and Judaism in Hebron
Yeshiva University alumni
Podcasters
Paratroopers
21st-century Israeli military personnel
1976 births